Tulika Maan (born 9 September 1998) is an Indian judoka who competes in the 78 kg weight class. She won a silver medal at the 2022 Commonwealth Games.

References

External links
 
 

Living people
1998 births
Indian female judoka
Sportswomen from Delhi
Indian female martial artists
Martial artists from Delhi
Judoka at the 2022 Commonwealth Games
Commonwealth Games silver medallists for India
Commonwealth Games medallists in judo
South Asian Games gold medalists for India
South Asian Games medalists in judo
Medallists at the 2022 Commonwealth Games